The Newsletter of Beijing International Studies University is the bi-weekly university newspaper of Beijing International Studies University. It is often referred to as BISU Newspaper or simply The Newspaper, and is currently supervised by the University Relations.

History

Formerly known as the UniLife, the Newspaper was originally established in 1965. The development of the Newspaper experienced twists and turns:

In 1976, shortly after the 26th issue was published, the Newspaper was forced to stop publication due to the Cultural Revolution. It resumed publication in 1981.

In July 1993, the laser typesetting technology came into use from the 201st issue, replacing the original block printing.

In 2001, under the permission of the National Press Bureau, UniLife was officially renamed Newsletter of Beijing International Studies University and started to issue to the public with the national serial number CN11—0965/(G).

As of October 2010, the Newspaper has published over 500 issues, which witnessed the growth of the University and recorded the relentless pursuit of BISU students. The bound volume of the first 26 issues in the BISU museum collections was donated by Zhu Qingyi, former Director of the Public Relations Office.

Awards
 China University News Prizes awarded by China Association of College Newspaper

Affiliations
 Xiangyu Oriental News Agency
 Beijing Collegial Journals Association, municipal first-class association
 Center for Journalism and Communication Studies

References

External links
 BISU Newspaper Online
BISU Newspaper Official Website
BISU Newspaper online display
BISU Newspaper Editorial: Official Renren
 BISU Press Corps: Official Renren
 University newspaper in China
China University Newspaper Online Platform
China Association of College Newspaper
Beijing University Newspaper Academy

Newsletter